Bhandarkund is a new railway station on Chhindwara–Nagpur branch line of Bilaspur–Nagpur section. It is located in Chhindwara district, Madhya Pradesh state, India. The station consists of two platforms.

Location 
Bhandarkund railway station serves Bhandar, a medium size village located in Mohkhed Tehsil of Chhindwara district in Madhya Pradesh. It pertains to Nagpur railway division, part of South East Central Railway zone of Indian Railways. Apart from this section, the rest of the narrow gauge network, once part of Satpura Railway, is being converted to broad-gauge lines.

Services 

References

External links 
 

Railway stations in Chhindwara district
Nagpur SEC railway division